Michele Merlo may refer to:

Michele Merlo (cyclist)
Michele Merlo (singer)

See also
Mike Merlo, a Chicago politician